The year 2006 in archaeology includes the following significant events.

Explorations
Tomb of the Roaring Lions

Excavations
KV63 - the Valley of the Kings, near Luxor, Egypt.
Ancient pre-Inca pet cemetery dated to the Chiribaya culture found south of Lima, Peru.
Ancient pre-Inca tombs complex dated to Middle Sican culture discovered under the Huaca Loro pyramid in Peru; 12 ceremonial tumi knives found.
Portions of Timișoara Fortress in Romania.

Finds
 July - The Faddan More Psalter, a devotional book, is found in a peat bog in Ireland, where it has been buried for approximately 1200 years.
 December
 Little Horwood Hoard of Iron Age gold staters from Buckinghamshire, England.
 River Boyne shipwreck of 1530s found off Drogheda in Ireland.
 Inscriptions in an early form of Linear Elamite discovered at Jiroft in Iran.
 Defences from the Siege of Leith (1560) discovered in Pilrig, Edinburgh, Scotland.
 Wreck of Type A Kō-hyōteki-class midget submarine, sunk in the 1942 attack on Sydney Harbour, discovered off Sydney's Northern Beaches.

Publications
 Steve Burrow - The Tomb-builders in Wales 4000-3000 BC 
 Andrea Carandini - Remo e Romolo: Dai rioni dei Quiriti alla città dei Romani (775/750 - 700/675 a.C. circa)  and La leggenda di Roma 
 Gwyn Davies - Roman Siege Works 
 Jürg Eggler & Othmar Keel - Corpus der Siegel-Amulette aus Jordanien: vom Neolithikum bis zur Perserzeit 
 Lars Fogelin - Archaeology of Early Buddhism 
 Matthew Johnson - Ideas of Landscape 
 Chris Stringer - Homo Britannicus: the Incredible Story of Human Life in Britain

Awards
 June - Barry Cunliffe knighted.

Events
October - British historian Alex Woolf publishes arguments that the Pictish kingdom of Fortriu was located around the Moray Firth region, further north in Scotland than the previous consensus.
The Kharosti scrolls, the oldest collection of Buddhist manuscripts in the world, are radiocarbon-dated by the Australian Nuclear Science and Technology Organisation (ANSTO).  The group confirms the initial dating of the Senior manuscripts to 130-250 CE and the Schøyen manuscripts to between the 1st and 5th centuries CE.
30th anniversary of the founding of the modern Korean Archaeological Society.

Deaths
 June 6 - Leslie Alcock, English archaeologist (b. 1925)
 August 2 - Richard Avent, British archaeologist, conservationist and civil servant (b. 1948)
 December 1 - Bruce Trigger, Canadian archaeologist and McGill University professor (b. 1937)

See also
 List of years in archaeology
 Karnak
 Pompeii
 Mayapan - recent excavations, near cenote wells.

References

Archaeology by year
 
Archaeology